The Leipzig Book Fair Prize is a literary award assigned annually during the Leipzig Book Fair to outstanding newly released literary works in the categories "Fiction", "Non-fiction" and "Translation". The Leipzig Book Fair Prize has been awarded since the Deutscher Bücherpreis was ceased in 2005, and is one of the most important literary awards in Germany. The winner in each category is awarded €15,000.

Leipzig Book Fair Prize

2005
 Fiction: Terézia Mora, Alle Tage
 Non-fiction: Rüdiger Safranski, Schiller oder die Erfindung des Deutschen Idealismus
 Translation: Thomas Eichhorn, for Les Murray's Fredy Neptune

2006
 Fiction: Ilija Trojanow, Der Weltensammler 
 Non-fiction: Franz Schuh, Schwere Vorwürfe. Schmutzige Wäsche 
 Translation: Ragni Maria Gschwend, for Antonio Moresco's Gli esordi

2007
 Fiction: Ingo Schulze, Handy 
 Non-fiction: Saul Friedländer, Das Dritte Reich und die Juden 2. Die Jahre der Vernichtung 1939–1945 (in English: The Years of Extermination: Nazi Germany and the Jews, 1939-1945)
 Translation: Svetlana Geier, for Fyodor Dostoyevsky's Подросток (English: The Raw Youth)

2008
 Fiction: Clemens Meyer, Die Nacht, die Lichter
 Non-fiction: Irina Liebmann, Wäre es schön? Es wäre schön!
 Translation: Fritz Vogelgsang, for Joanot Martorell's Tirant lo Blanc

2009
 Fiction: Sibylle Lewitscharoff, Apostoloff
 Non-fiction: Herfried Münkler, Die Deutschen und ihre Mythen
 Translation: Eike Schönfeld, for Saul Bellow's Humboldt's Gift

2010
Fiction: Georg Klein, Roman unserer Kindheit
Non-fiction: Ulrich Raulff, Kreis ohne Meister. Stefan Georges Nachleben
Translation: Ulrich Blumenbach, for David Foster Wallace's Unendlicher Spaß

2011
 Fiction: Clemens J. Setz, Die Liebe zur Zeit des Mahlstädter Kindes
 Non-fiction: Henning Ritter, Notizhefte 
 Translation: Barbara Conrad, for Leo Tolstoy's War and Peace

2012
 Fiction: Wolfgang Herrndorf, Sand
 Non-fiction: Jörg Baberowski, Verbrannte Erde. Stalins Herrschaft der Gewalt
 Translation: Christina Viragh, for Péter Nádas' Parallelgeschichten

2013
 Fiction: David Wagner, Leben
 Non-fiction: Helmut Böttiger, Die Gruppe 47. Als die deutsche Literatur Geschichte schrieb
 Translation: Eva Hesse, for Ezra Pound's The Cantos

2014 
 Fiction: Saša Stanišić, Vor dem Fest 
 Non-fiction: Helmut Lethen, Der Schatten des Fotografen
 Translation: Robin Detje, for William T. Vollmann's Europe Central

2015 
 Fiction: Jan Wagner, Regentonnenvariationen
 Non-fiction: Philipp Ther, Die neue Ordnung auf dem alten Kontinent
 Translation: Mirjam Pressler, for Amos Oz's Judas

2016 

 Fiction: Guntram Vesper: Frohburg
 Non-fiction: Jürgen Goldstein: Georg Forster. Zwischen Freiheit und Naturgewalt
 Translation: Brigitte Döbert for Bora Ćosić’s Die Tutoren

2017 

 Fiction: Natascha Wodin: Sie kam aus Mariupol
 Non-fiction: Barbara Stollberg-Rilinger: Maria Theresia. Die Kaiserin in ihrer Zeit
 Translation: Eva Lüdi Kong: a translation of Chinese popular folk tales and legends, Journey to the West

2018 

 Fiction: Esther Kinsky: Hain. Geländeroman
 Non-fiction: Karl Schlögel: Das sowjetische Jahrhundert. Archäologie einer untergegangenen Welt
 Translation: Sabine Stöhr and Juri Durkot: for Serhij Zhadan’s Internat

2019 
 Fiction: Anke Stelling: Schäfchen im Trockenen
 Non-fiction: Harald Jähner: Wolfszeit
 Translation: Eva Ruth Wemme: for Gabriela Adamesteanu′s Dimineață pierdută (German: Verlorener Morgen)

2020 
 Fiction: Lutz Seiler: Stern 111
 Non-Fiction: Bettina Hitzer: Krebs fühlen. Eine Emotionsgeschichte des 20. Jahrhundert
 Translation: Pieke Biermann: Oreo by Fran Ross

2021 
 Fiction: Iris Hanika: Echos Kammern
 Non-Fiction: Heike Behrend: Menschwerdung eines Affen. Eine Autobiografie der ethnografischen Forschung
 Translation: Timea Tankó: Apropos Casanova. Das Brevier des Heiligen Orpheus by Miklós Szentkuthy (translated from Hungarian)

References

External links
Leipzig Book Fair Prize, official website

German non-fiction literary awards
German-language literary awards
Awards established in 2005
Fiction awards
Translation awards
Events in Leipzig